Dan Barry (born February 19, 1983) is an American professional wrestler best known for his appearances with New York Wrestling Connection, Combat Zone Wrestling, Beyond Wrestling, All Elite Wrestling, Impact Wrestling, House of Hardcore, Pro Wrestling Guerilla among others.

Professional wrestling career

Independent circuit (2003-present)
In January 2003, Barry made his USA Pro Wrestling debut as part of a USA Pro gauntlet title nine man gauntlet match. Barry made his New York Wrestling Connection in February 2003 defeating Armand DeMuerto. Later that same night, Barry defeated Johnny Ova to become the NYWC Light Heavyweight Champion. In late 2004, Barry defeated Jay Lethal in a NYWC light heavyweight championship contendership match. The next month both Lethal and Barry lost to Joey Matthews in a three-way title match for the then vacant NYWC Heavyweight Championship. In early 2005, Barry was involved in a four-way NYWC Championship match, losing to Joey Matthews. In 2005, Ken Scampi and Dan Barry formed Team Tremendous. Later in 2005, Team Tremendous defeated The Dead Presidents and Brett Matthews and Brian Myers to become the New York Wrestling Connection Tag Team Champions for the first time. The duo lost the belts to Myers and Matthews in early 2006. In 2007, Barry won the NYWC Hi-Fi Championship by defeating plaZma. Dan Barry wrestled against Joey Braggiol in 2008 in a losing effort. This was his last match for NYWC until 2012 when he returned and took part in a battle royal.

In May 2004, Barry debuted for WrestleJam for their debut show where he was defeated by Spider in a ladder match. At WrestleJam 6 in 2010, Barry defeated Benny Martinez. In 2012 at WrestleJam 9, Team Tremendous defeated Tru-Talent.

At USA Pro's (now USA Xtreme Wrestling) Elements of Xtreme 2005, Barry along with Jay Lethal, Grim Reefer, Deranged and Azrieal were defeated by Sonny Siaki.

In 2010, Barry and Scampi defeated CT's Next Big Team (Lukas Sharp and Andy Sweet) to become the Connecticut Wrestling Entertainment Tag Team Champions for the first time.

In 2013, Dan Barry and Ken Scampi disbanded Team Tremendous and Barry formed Tremendous Investigations Inc. alongside Bill Carr. The duo went on to adopt the Team Tremendous name.

In 2014, Tremendous Investigations Inc. debuted for Combat Zone Wrestling defeating Milk Chocolate. Team Tremendous defeated The Young Bucks, The Beaver Boys, and then champions, O14K, at New Heights in 2015 to become the CZW Tag Team Champions for the first time. Team Tremendous successfully defended their belts against The Dollhouse (Marti Bell and Jade). Barry and Sozio (replacement for Bill Carr) as Team Tremendous lost the CZW tag team titles to #TVReady (BLK Jeez and Pepper Parks). In 2016 at The Boss Is Back, Barry competed in a four-way match where he was defeated by debuting Flip Gordon.

At Beyond Unbreakable, Team Tremendous and Biff Busick were defeated by the Young Bucks and Kevin Steen. At Beyond wrestling's Alive and Kicking, Barry took part of a ten man tag team elimination match teaming with the Juicy Product (David Starr and J. T. Dunn) and the Doom Patrol (Jaka and Chris Dickinson), losing to the Young Bucks. Barry was the last person eliminated from his team. Team Tremendous won Beyond's tournament for tomorrow 3 by defeating the Young Bucks in the finals.

Barry and Carr debuted for Evolve at Evolve 38, defeating Earl Cooter and Jody Kristofferson. At Evolve 54, Team Tremendous defeated Drew Gulak and Anthony Nese.

Team Tremendous defeated Roppongi Vice at DREAMWAVE Fight Before Christmas in 2015.

In 2017, Barry debuted for Full Impact Pro, defeating Billy Barboza. Later the same night he was defeated by Anthony Henry.

At House of Hardcore 32, The Spirit Squad defeated Team Tremendous.

WWE (2016)
Dan Barry made several appearances on WWE's Holy Foley! on the WWE Network as Mick Foley's hired trainer for his daughter Noelle Foley.

Personal life
Barry is also a stand-up comedian.

He has a dog named Tato.

Championships and accomplishments
Beyond Wrestling
Tournament For Tomorrow 3 - with Bill Carr
Combat Zone Wrestling
CZW World Tag Team Championship (1 time) - with Bill Carr
Connecticut Wrestling Entertainment
CTWE Tag Team Championship (1 time) - with Ken Scampi
Fight The World Wrestling
FTW Gen-X Championship (1 time)
Inter Species Wrestling
ISW Tag Team Championship (2 times, current) - with Bill Carr
New York Wrestling Connection
NYWC Fusion Championship (1 time, current)
NYWC Hi-Fi Championship (1 time)
NYWC Light Heavyweight Champion (3 times)
NYWC Tag Team Championship (2 times) - with Ken Scampi and Bill Carr
Real Warrior Entertainment
RWE Internet Championship (1 time, inaugural)
Stars & Stripes Championship Wrestling
SSCW Lightweight Championship (1 time)
The Wrestling Revolver
PWR Tag Team Championship (1 time) - with Bill Carr

References

External links
Twitter

American male professional wrestlers
American stand-up comedians
Living people
Combat Zone Wrestling
1983 births
People from Merrick, New York
Sportspeople from Nassau County, New York